Juan Betances (born 10 January 1983) is a sprinter from the Dominican Republic.

He finished fifth in the 4 × 400 metres relay at the 2006 World Indoor Championships, together with teammates Arismendy Peguero, Danis García and Carlos Santa.

External links

1983 births
Living people
Dominican Republic male sprinters
Place of birth missing (living people)
21st-century Dominican Republic people